Phelan Simpson (born January 24, 1996) is a Canadian former competitive pair skater. With Mary Orr, he finished in the top ten at the 2014 and 2015 World Junior Championships.

Career
Phelan was born in Comax British Columbia to Jill Simpson and Michael Knisley after his brother, Connor. Simpson started learning to skate in 2004. He moved from Calgary, Alberta to Waterloo, Ontario after being paired with Shalena Rau in 2008. Rau/Simpson were coached by Kristy Sargeant-Wirtz and Kris Wirtz at the Kitchener-Waterloo Skating Club. They parted ways following the 2013 Canadian Championships.

Simpson teamed up with Mary Orr in 2013. The pair won the junior bronze medal at the 2014 Canadian Championships. They were assigned to the 2014 World Junior Championships in Sofia, Bulgaria, where they finished sixth.

Orr/Simpson won the national junior title at the 2015 Canadian Championships and were named in Canada's team to the 2015 World Junior Championships in Tallinn, Estonia, where they finished tenth. Simpson then retired from competitive skating to pursue other interests.

Programs

With Mary Orr

With Shalena Rau

Competitive highlights 
JGP: Junior Grand Prix

With Mary Orr

With Shalena Rau

References

External links 

 
 

1996 births
Canadian male pair skaters
Living people
People from Comox, British Columbia
Sportspeople from British Columbia